The women's triple jump at the 2018 European Athletics Championships took place at the Olympic Stadium on 8 and 10 August.

Records

Schedule

Results

Qualification

Qualification: 14.05 m (Q) or best 12 performers (q)

Final

References

Triple jump W
Triple jump at the European Athletics Championships
Euro